The Advent Christian Church, also known as the Advent Christian General Conference (ACGC), is a "first-day" body of Adventist Christians founded on the teachings of William Miller in 1860. The organization's Executive Director is Reverend Steve Lawson, and its President is Reverend John Gallagher.

Headquartered in Charlotte, North Carolina, the functions of its central offices include global missions, leadership development, church health, church planting and management of organizational publications and media. These ministries are under the leadership of the organization's Executive Director, Rev. Steve Lawson, who is accountable to the organization's executive council. This council, a governing board made up of elected representatives from Advent Christian Churches, is chaired by the organization's president, Rev. John Gallagher.

In addition to the work of the central offices, more localized work is done in five regions of the U.S. and Canada under the direction of five regional superintendents, as well as in several state conference bodies and in 30 countries around the world.

The organization holds to a congregational structure, in which each of its member churches and their members has input into the overall direction of the organization.

Early history

William Miller

The first Advent Christian Association was founded in Salem, Massachusetts, in 1860. The church's formation is rooted in the Adventist teachings begun by Baptist preacher William Miller of Pittsfield, Massachusetts. For many years, Miller studied the prophecies recorded in the Old Testament, especially the book of Daniel, and the book of Revelation from the New Testament. After many calculations, he announced in 1831 that the Second Advent would occur in 1844. Thousands of people believed him and sold their possessions. His followers, called Millerites, waited for the coming of Christ and the end of the world and were greatly disappointed when his predictions proved incorrect.

Albany Conference
The Albany Conference, formed in the aftermath of Miller's failed predictions, was held in 1845. The conference included many major Millerite leaders, such as Miller himself. The Advent Christian Church has its roots in this group.

Jonathan Cummings
Jonathan Cummings (1817–1894), a disciple of Miller who reset Miller's prediction of Christ's coming to 1854, also influenced individuals who founded the Advent Christian Association. A third root of the Advent Christians is found in the rise of the doctrine of conditional immortality among Adventist preachers such as Charles F. Hudson (1795–1881) and George Storrs (1796–1879). Rejecting what they believed was a component of Greek philosophy (immortality of the soul), they taught that though man was created for immortality, that immortality had been forfeited in the fall of Adam. They believed that only the redeemed would receive eternal life; the dead unconsciously would await the resurrection and final judgement. At the time of judgement, the wicked would suffer extinction. These teachings separated them from some within the Millerite movement.

Beliefs

Statement of faith
The Advent Christian statement of faith is as follows:

Declaration of principles
The Advent Christian declaration of principles is as follows:

We believe that the Bible is the inspired Word of God, being in its entirety a revelation given to man under divine inspiration and providence; that its historic statements are correct, and that it is the only divine and infallible standard of faith and practice.
We believe, as revealed in the Bible:
In one God, our Father, eternal, and infinite in his wisdom, love, and power, the Creator of all things, "in whom we live, and move, and have our being."
And in Jesus Christ, our Lord, the only begotten Son of God, conceived of the Holy Spirit, born of the Virgin Mary; who came into our world to seek and to save that which was lost; who died for our sins; who was raised bodily from the dead for our justification; who ascended in heaven as our High Priest and Mediator, and who will come again in the end of this age, to judge the living and the dead, and to reign forever and ever.
And in the Holy Spirit, the Comforter, sent from God to convince the world of sin, of righteousness and of judgment, whereby we are sanctified and sealed unto the day of redemption.
We believe that man was created for immortality, but that through sin he forfeited his divine birthright; that because of sin, death entered into the world, and passed upon all men; and that only through faith in Jesus Christ, the divinely ordained Life-giver, can men become "partakers of the divine nature," and live forever.
We believe that death is a condition of unconsciousness to all persons, righteous and wicked; a condition which will remain unchanged until the resurrection at Christ's Second Coming, at which time the righteous will receive everlasting life while the wicked will be "punished with everlasting destruction;" suffering complete extinction of being.
We believe that salvation is free to all those who, in this life and in this age, accept it on the conditions imposed, which conditions are simple and inflexible, namely, turning from sin, repentance toward God, faith in the Lord Jesus Christ, and a life of consecration to the service of God; thus excluding all hope of a future probation, or of universal salvation.
We believe that Jesus Christ, according to his promise, will come again to this earth, even "in like manner" as he went into heaven - personally, visibly and gloriously - to reign here forever; and that this coming is the hope of the church, inasmuch as upon that coming depend the resurrection and reward of the righteous, the abolition of sin and its consequences, and the renewal of the earth - now marred by sin - to become the eternal home of the redeemed, after which event the earth will be forever free from sin and death.
We believe that Bible prophecy has indicated the approximate time of Christ's return, and comparing its testimony with the signs of our times, we are confident that he is near, "even at the doors," and we believe that the great duty of the hour is the proclamation of this soon-coming redemption, the defense of Bible authority, inspiration and truth, and the salvation of lost men.
We believe the church of Christ is an institution of divine origin, which includes all true Christians, of whatever name; but that local church organizations should be independent of outside control, congregational in government, and subject to no dictation of priest, bishop or pope - although true fellowship and unity of action should exist between all such organizations.
We believe that the only ordinances of the church of Christ are Baptism and the Lord's Supper; immersion being the only true baptism.
We believe that the first day of the week, as the day set apart by the early church in commemoration of Christ's resurrection, should be observed as the Christian Sabbath, and used as a day of rest and religious worship.
We believe that war is contrary to the spirit and teachings of our Lord and Master, Jesus Christ; that it is contrary to the spirit of true brotherhood; and that our influence should be used against it. We believe the Bible also teaches that properly constituted government is ordained by God and is a divine instrument for man's welfare and protection. When an Advent Christian decides on the basis of Scripture and conscience, either to bear arms or to submit to penalties imposed for his refusal to do so, local Advent Christian congregations should extend continued fellowship and nurture.

Statistics
In 2006, the Advent Christian Church had about 25,600 members in 293 churches across the United States─a number not radically different from the 28,300 it had in 1925, with relatively stable membership during the intervening years. The largest concentration of churches is along the eastern coast of the United States, where they have a strong concentration of churches in most states. Additionally, they claim approximately 100,000 members internationally, spread out over work in 30 countries.

Memberships and partnerships
The Advent Christian Church is a member of the National Association of Evangelicals and the Evangelical Council for Financial Accountability. They also have working partnerships with several other evangelical ministries.

See also
Christian revival
Christianity in the 19th century
Sarah Katherine Taylor 
Joshua Vaughan Himes
List of Christian denominations#Millerites and comparable groups
List of religions and religious denominations#Adventist and related churches
Second Great Awakening
Other movements in :Category:Adventism

References

Bibliography

Glenmary Research Center. Churches and Church Membership in the United States (1990).
Hewitt, Clyde E. Midnight and Morning: The Millerite Movement and the Founding of the Advent Christian Church.
 (Part VIII highlights the Albany Conference of 1845 which became a formative meeting in the development of the Advent Christian denomination (132).)
Mead, Frank S.; Hill, Samuel S.; Atwood, Craig D. Handbook of Denominations in the United States.
Melton, J. Gordon (ed.). Encyclopedia of American Religions.

External links

1860 establishments in Massachusetts
Adventism
Members of the National Association of Evangelicals
Protestant denominations established in the 19th century
Religious organizations established in 1860
Trinitarianism